Musa bin Shakir is the father of the Banu Musa ("Sons of Musa"), the renowned 9th-century scholars of Baghdad. Earlier in life, he had been a highwayman and astronomer in Khorasan and was a Persian. After befriending al-Maʾmūn, who was then a governor of Khorasan and staying in Marw, Musa was employed as an astrologer and astronomer. When he died, he left his three sons in the custody of Al-Ma'mun.

See also
 Banu Musa
 List of Iranian scientists and scholars

References 

9th-century Iranian astronomers
Astronomers of the medieval Islamic world